The Dartmouth Chronicle is a weekly, local, paid-for newspaper based in the area of Dartmouth, Devon, England, UK. The full title is Dartmouth Chronicle & South Hams Gazette. A publication of Tindle Newspapers Ltd., which runs five newspapers in total.

References

Weekly newspapers published in the United Kingdom
Dartmouth, Devon
Newspapers published in Devon